Calathus ellipticus is a species of ground beetle from the Platyninae subfamily that can be found in Bulgaria and Greece.

References

ellipticus
Beetles described in 1889
Beetles of Europe